Stella's Fish Café & Prestige Oyster Bar was a rooftop seafood restaurant and oyster bar on west Lake Street in Minneapolis, Minnesota. On November 19, 2022 the restaurant announced that it would close its doors on November 26 after 17 years in service.

History
Stella's Fish Café opened for business in 2005. In September 2022 a video of a rat crawling across a bin of rice at the restaurant went viral, causing the café to shut down temporarily.

References

2005 establishments in Minnesota
Oyster bars in the United States
Seafood restaurants in the United States
Defunct seafood restaurants in the United States
Defunct restaurants in the United States
2022 disestablishments in Minnesota
Restaurants established in 2005
Restaurants disestablished in 2022
Companies based in Minneapolis